"Blue Guitar" is a 2011 song by the Slovak recording artist Celeste Buckingham. Released on July 20, 2011, the composition wrote singer herself along with producers Andrej Hruška and Martin Šrámek. Upon its release on the corresponding album Don't Look Back, her debut single received positive reviews from music journalists.

Critical reception
The composition received positive reviews from music critics. While reviewing the Buckingham's first studio album, Daniel Maršalík from the Czech REPORT commented the work: "Blue Guitar featuring a mid-tempo, it would not get lost on the music charts.". A similar opinion shared Jana Moravcová of Koule.cz, after ranking the "guitar song" amongst those that demonstrate a "hit potential."

Credits and personnel
 Celeste Buckingham - lead vocalist, writer, producer, publisher
 Andrej Hruška - writer, producer, guitar
 Martin Šrámek - writer, producer, keyboard
 LittleBeat - recording studio
 EMI Czech Republic - distributor

Track listings
 "Blue Guitar" (Album version) — 3:44

Charts

References
General

Specific

External links
 CelesteBuckingham.com > Gallery > Music > "Blue Guitar"

2011 singles
2011 songs
Celeste Buckingham songs
Songs written by Celeste Buckingham
EMI Records singles